The 1909 USFSA Football Championship was the 16th staging of the USFSA Football Championship. The tournament was held on the road between 7 March and 25 April 1909. The tournament was won by SH Marseille after beating CA Paris 3–2 in the final.

Tournament

First round
Stade rennais 11–1 Club Malherbe Caennais

1/8 Finals  
Stade rennais 5–1 Le Havre AC
CA Paris 17–1 Angers Université Club
FC Lyon 5–2 Racing Club Franc-Comtois de Besançon
Racing Club de Reims 4–1 Amiens SC 
Stade nantais université club 1–0 Stade toulousain
US Tourcoing 3–0 Cercle des Sports Stade Lorrain
Stade Bordelais UC 2–1 Olympique de Cette 
SH Marseille - Stade Raphaëlois (Raphaëlois forfeited)

Quarterfinals  
CA Paris 8–3 Stade rennais
Stade Bordelais UC 4–0 Stade nantais université club
US Tourcoing 3–0 Racing Club de Reims
SH Marseille 12–0 FC Lyon

Semifinals  
CA Paris 1–0 US Tourcoing
SH Marseille - Stade Bordelais UC (Bordeaux forfeited)

Final 

At the time, only clubs from Paris, the North and Normandy had reached the final, so CA Paris reaching the final proves the development of football in Southern France. They found themselves leading two goals to one at half-time, but SH Marseille, who fielded a team with 10 Swiss players and one English men, reversed the situation in the second half thanks to a brace from Widdington, thus winning their first title of champion of France.

References

RSSSF

USFSA Football Championship
1
France